Route 64 may refer to:

Route 64 (MTA Maryland), a bus route in Baltimore, Maryland and its suburbs
London Buses route 64
Route 64 (WMATA), a bus route in Washington, D.C.
Melbourne tram route 64

See also
List of highways numbered 64

64